Charles Logue may refer to:
Charles Logue (politician) (1922–2000), Democratic member of the Pennsylvania House of Representatives
Charles Logue (builder) (1858–1919), Irish immigrant to the U.S. who founded the Charles Logue Building Company
Charles A. Logue (1889–1938), American screenwriter